Chalabi is a surname. Notable people with the surname include:

 Nuri Ja'far (1914 – 1991) Iraqi psychologist and philosopher of education
Ahmed Chalabi (1944–2015), Iraqi politician
Burhan Al-Chalabi (born 1947), British-Iraqi writer and political commentator
Edgard Chalabi (1928–1963), Lebanese chess master
Fadhil Chalabi (1929–2019), Iraqi oil economist
Hassan Chalabi (1928- 2019) Iraqi-Lebanese Professor of Law
Mona Chalabi (born 1987), British writer
Salem Chalabi (born 1963), Iraqi lawyer
Selma Chalabi (fl. 2000s), British radio producer and journalist

See also
Çelebi (disambiguation)